Pyburn House, at 203 Fourth Street in Lovington, New Mexico, is an unusual building which was built during 1935–1937.  It has also been known as Pyburn Apartments and as the Cornerstone Inn. It was listed on the National Register of Historic Places in 1995.

It was a work of John Wesley Pyburn in Folk architecture. Pyburn was superintendent of the schools in Lovington during 1930 to 1938, a period when population and the schools were growing rapidly.  He was a mason and built the house during the summers of 1935, 1936, and 1937, intending for it to be home for his family plus also to serve as boarding house for teachers.  Ethel Pyburn, his wife, managed the apartments serving boarders until her death in 1986 at the age of 96.

References

Houses on the National Register of Historic Places in New Mexico
Residential buildings completed in 1937
Buildings and structures in Lea County, New Mexico
Hotels in New Mexico
New Mexico State Register of Cultural Properties
1937 establishments in New Mexico